Drowaton is the third studio album by the indie pop band Starlight Mints.

Track listing
All tracks by Starlight Mints

 "Pumpkin" – 2:40
 "Torts" – 2:03
 "Inside of Me" – 3:43
 "Pearls (Submarine #2)" – 2:14
 "Seventeen Devils" – 3:49
 "Rhino Stomp" – 3:24
 "The Killer" – 3:02
 "Eyes of the Night" – 2:51
 "Drowaton" – 5:01
 "The Bee" – 3:27
 "Rosemarie" – 3:29
 "Sidewalk" – 4:24

References

2006 albums
Starlight Mints albums